Dream This is the debut album from Joe 90, released on Adam Duritz's label E Pluribus Unum through Geffen.

Critical reception
Rolling Stone wrote that "singer-guitarist Chris Seefried steers along melodically facile, softly yelping rockers like 'Mascara' and 'Drive' - the album's showstopper - with velvety imprecision." The Washington Post called it "a modestly appealing pop-rock release, boasting a few intriguing lyrics and more than its share of sturdy melodic hooks."

Track listing

Personnel
 Chris Seefried – vocals, electric guitar, acoustic guitar, slide guitar, mellotron, piano, samples
 Gary DeRosa – piano, wurlitzer, organ, casio, synthesizer, percussion, background vocals
 Craig Ruda – bass, loop guitar
 Adam Hamilton – drums, electric guitar, bass, samples, loops

Additional personnel
 Adam Duritz – vocals
 Scott Wolf – handclapping
 Stan Lynch – production
 Tony Visconti – mixing
 Stephen Marcussen – mastering
 Daphne Chen – violin
 Daniel Rosa – violin
 Bo Dong – viola
 Fang Fang Xu – cello
 Morty Coyle – vocal harmony
 Mark Dutton – production, mixing
 Rob Jacobs – mixing
 Robert Hawes – mixing, engineering
 Jeffrey Bender – photography
 Peter Reitzfeld – photography
 Star Jasper – photography

Single

References 

1999 debut albums
Albums produced by Chris Seefried
Joe 90 (band) albums